Arnaut Danjuma Groeneveld (born 31 January 1997) is a professional footballer who plays as a winger for Premier League club Tottenham Hotspur, on loan from La Liga club Villarreal, and the Netherlands national team.

After making one substitute appearance for Jong PSV in the Eerste Divisie, he played for NEC in the Eredivisie and Eerste Divisie, Club Brugge in the Belgian First Division A and AFC Bournemouth in the Premier League and EFL Championship. He signed for Villarreal for an estimated €25 million in 2021.

Born in Nigeria and raised mainly in the Netherlands, Danjuma earned his first cap for the Dutch national team in October 2018. He was recalled to the team three years later.

Club career

Early career 
Danjuma was born in Lagos, Nigeria to a Dutch father and a Nigerian mother. After his parents' divorce, he was briefly homeless and spent time in foster care. He joined PSV in 2008 from TOP Oss; he made his professional debut for Jong PSV in the Eerste Divisie on 7 December 2015 against NAC, replacing Moussa Sanoh after 65 minutes of a 3–0 home loss.

In the summer of 2016, Danjuma signed for NEC where he was expected to play for the second team. On 10 September, he made his debut and first Eredivisie appearance against his former club PSV; he was an 85th-minute substitute for Reagy Ofosu in a 4–0 home loss. In 16 appearances in his first season, he scored once to open a 2–0 win at Heerenveen on the final day of the season; the team were relegated through the playoffs.

Club Brugge
In July 2018, Danjuma signed for Club Brugge. He made his debut on 22 July in the 2018 Belgian Super Cup, helping his team to a 2–1 win over Standard Liège. On 3 October, he scored a goal against Atlético Madrid in a 3–1 loss in the Champions League group stage. In his only full season in the Belgian First Division A, he scored five goals, starting with two in a 3–0 home win over Kortrijk on 10 August.

AFC Bournemouth
On 1 August 2019, Danjuma joined Premier League club AFC Bournemouth for a fee of £13.7 million, signing a long-term contract. He made his debut against Burton Albion in the third round of the EFL Cup on 25 September, as a 61st-minute substitute for Dominic Solanke in a 2–0 away loss; his first goal was in a 3–2 win against Blackburn Rovers on 12 September 2020. 

After ten goal contributions in a month, Danjuma was awarded the Championship Player of the Month award for April 2021. He was awarded the Bournemouth Player of the Year award after receiving 40% of the supporters' vote, narrowly beating Asmir Begović who had 38% of the vote.

Villarreal
On 19 August 2021, Danjuma joined La Liga club Villarreal for a fee believed to be in the region of €25 million, signing a contract until June 2026. He scored his first goal for the club in a 1–1 draw with reigning league champions Atlético Madrid on 29 August, and his first UEFA Champions League goal in a 2–2 draw against Atalanta on 14 September. On 19 February 2022, he scored a hat-trick in a 4–1 league victory over Granada; two months later he contributed both goals of a home win against regional rivals Valencia.

Danjuma scored six Champions League goals in his first season at Villarreal. His brace in a 3–2 win at Atalanta on 9 December put the team into the last 16 as group runners-up. On 6 April 2022, he scored the only goal against Bayern Munich at the Estadio de la Cerámica in the quarter-finals first leg; he missed the second leg of the semi-final elimination by Liverpool through a muscle injury.

Loan to Tottenham Hotspur
During January 2023, Danjuma was set to return to England to join Everton, before Tottenham Hotspur hijacked the deal. On 25 January 2023, he joined Tottenham on loan until the end of the season. Three days later Danjuma was added to the squad as a substitute for the FA Cup game. He came off the bench marking his debut and scored a goal in the 3–0 victory away against Preston North End.

International career
Danjuma was born in Nigeria to a Dutch father and Nigerian mother, and was eligible for either national team. He was first called up for the Dutch national team by Ronald Koeman in October 2018. He made his debut on 13 October in a 3–0 UEFA Nations League home win over Germany, as a 68th-minute substitute for former Jong PSV teammate Steven Bergwijn. Three days later, he scored his first international goal to equalise in a 1–1 friendly draw away to neighbours Belgium.

After nearly three years without a cap, Danjuma returned to the squad as a replacement for Cody Gakpo. On 11 October 2021 in a 2022 FIFA World Cup qualifier at home to Gibraltar, he came off the bench and scored in a 6–0 win. Louis van Gaal did not call him up for the final tournament in Qatar.

Personal life
Arnaut and Danjuma are the player's first names, with him describing the latter as his Nigerian name; he also uses Adam as his Muslim name. He was raised Muslim but stated that he did not become a practising Muslim until he was an adult; he celebrates goals by saying the Tahmid.

Career statistics

Club

International

As of match played 11 October 2021. Netherlands score listed first, score column indicates score after each Danjuma goal.

Honours
Club Brugge
Belgian Super Cup: 2018

Individual
Championship Player of the Month: April 2021
AFC Bournemouth Player of the Year: 2020–21

References

External links

Profile at the Tottenham Hotspur F.C. website
Profile at the Royal Dutch Football Association website

1997 births
Living people
Sportspeople from Lagos
Dutch footballers
Dutch Muslims
Nigerian Muslims
Netherlands under-21 international footballers
Netherlands international footballers
Nigerian footballers
Dutch people of Nigerian descent
Nigerian people of Dutch descent
Association football midfielders
PSV Eindhoven players
Jong PSV players
NEC Nijmegen players
Club Brugge KV players
AFC Bournemouth players
Villarreal CF players
Tottenham Hotspur F.C. players
Eredivisie players
Eerste Divisie players
Belgian Pro League players
Premier League players
English Football League players
La Liga players
Dutch expatriate footballers
Expatriate footballers in Belgium
Expatriate footballers in England
Expatriate footballers in Spain
Dutch expatriate sportspeople in Belgium
Dutch expatriate sportspeople in England
Dutch expatriate sportspeople in Spain